Atomic Runner Chelnov is a Japanese runner arcade video game developed and published by Data East in 1988.

Gameplay

The player controls Chelnov's movements with the eight-way joystick, and the three buttons to attack, jump, or turn around. Six types of weapons can be obtained during the game: laser, fire rings, boomerangs, spike bola balls, spike ball whip, missiles. By collecting power-ups you can improve Chelnov's attack power, rapid-firing capability, attack range or jumping height.

The game is a forced side-scrolling game where the screen continually scrolls to the left at a constant speed unless the player is fighting a boss, in which the screen will stop scrolling. Chelnov will continue to run with the screen even if the player lets go of the joystick. Though the player can move to the left or right of the scrolling screen by entering the corresponding direction on the joystick, it is impossible to stop or move backwards except when fighting a boss (Chelnov can turn backwards while jumping). The main character's sprite animation is highly detailed and smooth for its time, comparable to the level of Karateka and the early Prince of Persia games. The ending screen appears when the player finishes all seven levels of the game.

Plot
The player takes the role of Chelnov (Челнов), a coal miner who miraculously survives the malfunction and explosion of a nuclear power plant. Chelnov's body gains superhuman abilities due to the massive amount of radiation given off by the explosion, and a secret organization seeks to harness those abilities for its own evil purposes. Chelnov must battle and defeat the secret organization using his newfound abilities.

Development
Atomic Runner Chelnov was controversial at the time of release. The setting, where a coal miner is caught in a nuclear accident, a hammer and sickle visible on the game's opening screen, and the game's title (Chernobyl is written チェルノブイリ in Japanese) led many to interpret the game as a parody of the Chernobyl disaster. Data East responded in a television program that the name "Chelnov" was merely a relative of Karnov, the title character of one of the company's games, and was not at all influenced by the events at Chernobyl. Other development staff members later explained that the game had been planned under a different name, but the events at Chernobyl led to the name "Chelnov", which became the game's title. Under this explanation, the parodic elements resulted purely out of coincidence, but over a year and a half passed from the accident to the first release of the game, which was ample time for the developers to reassess the suitability of the game's plot and content. The game's storyline was changed considerably to remove connotations with Chernobyl when the game was ported to the Sega Mega Drive/Genesis.

After Data East became defunct due to bankruptcy in 2003, Paon bought the rights to Atomic Runner Chelnov.

Ports
The game was first ported to the Sega Genesis in 1992, but many parts of the game were remade. The Japanese version kept the same name as its arcade counterpart, but the North American and European versions were simply titled Atomic Runner. The game's plot was changed completely, where Chelnov is not a coal miner caught in a nuclear meltdown, but a regular human being wearing a special combat suit who battles enemies to rescue his younger sister. The game's enemies and background images were also changed to those reminiscent of an ancient civilization. This version was released for the Wii Virtual Console in Japan on September 11, 2007.

The game released for the X68000 in 1993. This version is almost identical to the original arcade version.

A port to the Sega Saturn was planned and developed, but was never released to consumers. A version of it appeared in the Tokyo Game Show and several game stores in Akihabara around 1997, but its release was cancelled by Data East for unknown reasons. A fully playable prototype of the Sega Saturn version was found in 2012. The Saturn prototype is a duplicate of the 1988 arcade game but lacks sound effects, though the music is still present.

Reception 
In Japan, Game Machine listed Atomic Runner Chelnov on their March 1, 1988 issue as being the thirteenth most-successful table arcade unit of the month.

Legacy
Chelnov also appears as an enemy character in Trio The Punch, Tumble Pop (1991), and Fighter's History: Mizoguchi Kiki Ippatsu!! (1995), and can be seen being transported in a frozen container on a freight train in Bad Dudes Vs. DragonNinja (1988). In Sly Spy (1989), a poster showing Chelnov can be seen at the beginning of Stage 4. He can also be seen in Windjammers 2 (2020), as a member of the crowd on the Ring stage.

See also
 Karnov
 Fighter's History characters

Notes

References

External links 
 
 Atomic Runner Chelnov at GameFAQs
 Atomic Runner Chelnov at Giant Bomb
 Atomic Runner Chelnov at Killer List of Videogames
 Atomic Runner Chelnov at MobyGames

1988 video games
Arcade video games
Cancelled Sega Saturn games
Data East video games
Nuclear accidents in fiction
Scrolling shooters
Sega video games
Sega Genesis games
X68000 games
Side-scrolling platform games
Video games set in New York City
Virtual Console games
Multiplayer and single-player video games
Fictional Russian people in video games
Data East arcade games
Video games developed in Japan